Trans-Atlantyk  is a novel by the Polish author Witold Gombrowicz, originally published in 1953. The semi-autobiographical plot of the novel closely tracks Gombrowicz's own experience in the years during and just after the outbreak of World War II.

Plot
Witold, a Polish writer, embarks on an ocean voyage only to have the war break out while he is visiting Argentina. Finding himself penniless and stranded after the Nazis take over his country, he is taken in by the local Polish emigre community. A fantastical series of twists and turns follow in which the young man finds himself, after a debauched night of drinking, involved as a second in a duel. Witold is constantly confronted with the exasperating contrasts between his love of country and his status as a forced expatriate and the shallow nationalism of his fellow Poles.

Analysis

The book is an extended examination of what one's nationality is and what it means. The language of Trans-Atlantyk is unusual, as it is written in the style of a "gawęda," an ancient form of oral storytelling that was common among the rural Polish nobility. As such, it is very much in the tradition of another legendary work by a Polish exile writer, the epic poem Pan Tadeusz, by Adam Mickiewicz. Gombrowicz wrote himself that "Trans-Atlantic was born in me like a Pan Tadeusz in reverse". The 1994 Carolyn French/Nina Karsov  English-language translation uses a sort of faux-seventeenth century English, resulting in a work that the translators themselves regard as "experimental".

1953 novels
20th-century Polish novels
Novels by Witold Gombrowicz
Novels set during World War II
Novels set in Argentina
Polish historical novels
Polish novels
Polish satire
Works by Witold Gombrowicz